Gorevision is a film production and distribution company from Argentina founded by Germán Magariños in 2001. The company produces low budget independent movies, many of which have developed cult followings around the world.

Gorevision films are known for their shocking imagery and are considered horror comedies; some would categorize them as "shock exploitation films".  They typically contain overt sexuality, graphic violence, gore, nudity and punk rock bands playing live.

Many of their movies are distributed in the US and Spain, like Sadomaster (by SRS Cinema)

In 2005 the movie Goreinvasion won the Dogpile award given by Troma.

Films
 Un Cazador de Zombis (2008) 
 Sadomaster (2005) 
 Goreinvasión (2004)
 Vio la luna... y compró un cementerio (2003)
 La Sangre de Frankenstein (aka LSD Frankenstein) (2002)
 Holocausto Cannabis - USA title: Cannabis Holocaust: Mutant Hell (2001)
 Mondo Malala (2000)

External links
 Gorevision Official Website
 Movie review (english) 
 Another movie review (english) 
 More reviews and interviews

Film production companies of Argentina